Ryder is both a surname and masculine given name. Notable people with the name include:

Surname:
 Albert Pinkham Ryder (1847–1917), American painter
 Alfred Ryder (1916–1995), American actor, born as Alfred Jacob Corn
 Arthur W. Ryder (1877–1938) American professor of Sanskrit and translator
 Charles W. Ryder (1892–1960), US Army General
 Charles Henry Dudley Ryder (1868–1945), English army officer and explorer
 Chauncey Foster Ryder (1868–1949), American painter
 Cynthia Ryder (born 1966), American rower
 Deb Ryder, American blues singer and songwriter
 Derek Ryder (born 1947), English footballer
 Dial D. Ryder (1938–2011), American gunsmith
 Don Ryder, Baron Ryder of Eaton Hastings (1916–2003), chairman of the UK National Enterprise Board, responsible for the 1975 Ryder Report
 Donald J. Ryder, U.S. military lawyer, responsible for the 2003 Ryder Report on prisoner abuse in Iraq
 Dudley Ryder, 1st Earl of Harrowby (1762–1847), English politician
 Dudley Ryder, 2nd Earl of Harrowby (1798–1882), English politician
 Dudley Ryder, 3rd Earl of Harrowby (1831–1900), English politician
 Dudley Ryder, 7th Earl of Harrowby (1922–2007), deputy chairman of Coutts bank and NatWest
 Graham Ryder (1949–2002), English lunar scientist
 Henry Ignatius Dudley Ryder (1837–1907), English Roman Catholic priest
 James A. Ryder (1800–1860), American Jesuit priest
 Jeremy Ryder (born 1954), British musician known professionally as Jack Hues
 Jesse Ryder (born 1984), New Zealand cricketer
 John Ryder (disambiguation), multiple people
 Jonathan Ryder, pseudonym of American thriller author Robert Ludlum
 Margaret Ryder (1908–1998), British artist
 Michael Ryder (born 1980), NHL hockey player
 Mitch Ryder (born 1945), American musician
 Paddy Ryder (born 1988), Australian football player
 Richard Ryder (1766–1832), British 19th century politician
 Richard Andrew Ryder (born 1949), British politician
 Richard D. Ryder (born 1940), British animal rights activist
 Robert Edward Dudley Ryder (1908–1986), British military hero and politician
 Samuel Ryder (1858–1936), businessman and golf enthusiast
 Serena Ryder (born 1983), Canadian singer/songwriter
 Shaun Ryder (born 1962), British singer/songwriter
 Thomas P. Ryder (born 1985), Anglo-Scot rugby union player
 Thomas Ryder (1863–1935), American baseball player
 Tom Ryder (born 1949), American lawyer and politician
 William T. Ryder (1913–1992), Brigadier general and first American paratrooper
  Dr Andrew Ryder (born 1964) researcher and campaigner for Roma communities
 Winona Ryder (born 1971), American actress
 James A. Ryder, founder of Ryder System, Inc.
 Zack Ryder (born 1985), a former ring name of American professional wrestler Matt Cardona

Given name:
 Ryder Hesjedal (born 1980), Canadian professional racing cyclist
 Ryder Matos Santos (born 1993), Brazilian footballer
 Ryder Windham, American writer

Fictional characters:
 Honey Ryder, the Bond girl in the 1962 film Dr. No
 Charles Ryder, the protagnaist of Evelyn Waugh's Brideshead Revisited
 James Ryder, in The Blue Carbuncle, a Sherlock Holmes story by Arthur Conan Doyle
 Lance "Ryder" Wilson, a fictional character in the video game Grand Theft Auto: San Andreas Red Ryder, a fictional cowboy character
 Ryder, a character in the Skrull Kill Krew comics
 Ryder Callahan, a character on the CBS soap opera The Young and the Restless John Ryder, a character in the 1986 film The Hitcher and its 2007 remake
 Ryder, the main human character of the Canadian animated preschool TV series PAW Patrol Ryder, the protagonist of the Kazuo Ishiguro novel The Unconsoled Scott/Sara Ryder, main character of the video game Mass Effect: Andromeda Ryder White, a character in the video game series Dead Island Mr. Ryder, the biracial main character of Charles W. Chesnutt's short story The Wife of His Youth''

English-language surnames
Masculine given names
English masculine given names